BRP Datu Marikudo (PS-23) was a  of the Philippine Navy. She was renamed USS Amherst (PCE(R)-853) on 15 February 1956. In February 1970, Amherst was decommissioned and transferred to South Vietnam for service in the Republic of Vietnam Navy as RVNS Vạn Kiếp II (HQ-14). She remained in South Vietnamese service until the collapse of that country in 1975. Vạn Kiếp II was one of several ships that fled from South Vietnam to the Philippines. She was then commissioned into the Philippine Navy on 5 April 1976 and named in honor of Datu Marikudo. Along with other World War II-era ships of the Philippine Navy, Datu Marikudo was considered one of the oldest active fighting ships in the world until her decommissioning.

History

Commissioned in the US Navy as the USS PCER-853 in 1944, she was assigned in the Pacific theatre of operations, first in support of landing operations in Leyte and Lingayen in the Philippine Islands. She was also assigned to convoy escort duties, rescue operations, and other combat support duties in Okinawa area.

PCER-853 entered the Navy yard in Hawaii and was still undergoing overhaul when Japan capitulated. In September 1945, the vessel steamed to the east coast of the United States and was placed in the Atlantic Reserve Fleet at Green Cove Springs, Fla.

In December 1947, PCER-853 served as a training vessel for Naval Reserve personnel in the 4th Naval District. The ship was placed back in active status on 28 November 1950 and carried out training duty at Philadelphia for the next 10 years. On 15 February 1956, the ship was renamed the Amherst (PCE(R)-853). On 6 February 1970, Amherst was placed in an "out of service, special" status for pre-transfer overhaul. Her name was struck from the Navy list on 3 June 1970.

She was then transferred to the Republic of Vietnam in 1970. She served the Republic of Vietnam Navy as Vạn Kiếp II (HQ-14) up until her escape to the Philippines in 1975, together with other South Vietnamese Navy ships and their respective crew.

She was commissioned into the Philippine Navy and was renamed RPS (now BRP) Datu Marikudo (PS-23). Her last assignment was with the Patrol Force of the Philippine Fleet, She was programmed to have major repair as of 2007, but on 9 December 2010 she was decommissioned after she was found to be beyond economical repair and will be sold as scrap. Her equipment was stripped as spare for her operational sisterships.

Technical details
Originally the ship was armed with one 3"/50 caliber dual purpose gun, two single Bofors 40 mm guns, six Oerlikon 20 mm cannon guns, 1 Hedgehog depth charge projector, four depth charge projectiles (K-guns) and two depth charge racks.

The same configuration applies up until the late 1980s when the Philippine Navy removed most of her old anti-submarine weapons and systems, and instead mounted one 40 mm gun mount, four 20 mm Oerlikon Mk10 guns, and four 12.7 mm general purpose machine guns. This made her lighter and ideal for surface patrols, but losing her limited but dated anti-submarine warfare capability.

The ship is powered by two GM 12-278A diesel engines similar to her sister ships, with a combined rating of around  driving two propellers.

There are slight difference between the BRP Datu Marikudo as compared to some of her sister ships in the Philippine Navy, since her previous configuration was as a patrol craft escort, while there are others who were originally configured as minesweepers.

References

External links
 Philippine Defense Forum
 Philippine Navy @ Hazegray.org
 DLSU ROTC
 Opus224's Unofficial Philippine Defense Page
 NavSource Online: Patrol Craft Escort Photo Archive

PCE(R)-848-class patrol craft
Ships built in Chicago
1944 ships
Ships transferred from the United States Navy to the Republic of Vietnam Navy
PCE(R)-848-class patrol craft of the Philippine Navy
Miguel Malvar-class corvettes